Mario Gjata (born 6 July 2000) is an Albanian professional footballer who currently plays as a centre-forward for Albanian club Dinamo Tirana.

References

2000 births
Living people
People from Fier
People from Fier County
Albanian footballers
Association football forwards
Kategoria e Parë players
KF Apolonia Fier players